Pall Jenkins is an American vocalist, guitarist and music producer. He is the front man for the bands Three Mile Pilot and The Black Heart Procession, as well as his collaborations with Vampire Rodents and Ugly Casanova.

Biography 
Pall Jenkins formed Three Mile Pilot with bassist Zach Smith and drummer Thomas Zinser in 1991. The band released three albums before parting ways so they could focus on individual projects. Jenkins then formed The Black Heart Procession in 1997 with Tobias Nathaniel, who had previously collaborated with him on Three Mile Pilot. The duo released six albums over the span of eleven years and achieved a degree of critical acclaim and recognition for their work. In 2006, Jenkins formed Mr. Tube and the Flying Objects with bass player and trumpeter Brad Lee. In 2010, a reunited Three Mile Pilot released The Inevitable Past Is the Future Forgotten, an album that was five years in the making.

Discography

References

External links

American rock singers
American rock guitarists
American male guitarists
Living people
People from San Diego
Three Mile Pilot members
Singer-songwriters from California
Guitarists from California
Ugly Casanova members
Year of birth missing (living people)
American male singer-songwriters